Ministry of Science, Technology and Environment may refer to:

Ministry of Science, Technology and Environment (Cuba)
Ministry of Science, Technology and Environment (Malaysia)
Ministry of Science, Technology and Environment (Nepal)
Ministry of Science, Technology and Environment (Thailand)